Statistics of Belgian First Division in the 1979–80 season.

Overview

It was contested by 18 teams, and Club Brugge K.V. won the championship.

League standings

Results

References

Belgian Pro League seasons
Belgian
1979–80 in Belgian football